Mimecast Limited is an   American–British, Jersey-domiciled company specializing in cloud-based email management for Microsoft Exchange and Microsoft Office 365, including security, archiving, and continuity services to protect business mail.

History
Mimecast was founded in 2003 by Peter Bauer and Neil Murray. It has offices in London, Boston, Chicago, San Francisco, Dallas,  Cape Town, Johannesburg, Melbourne, Amsterdam, Munich and Israel. On October 16, 2015, Mimecast announced that it filed its registration statement for a proposed initial public offering (IPO). Mimecast began trading on the Nasdaq Global Select Market under the ticker symbol "MIME" on November 19, 2015. The offering closed on November 24, 2015.

On July 10, 2018, Mimecast acquired cybersecurity training start up Ataata.

On July 31, 2018, Mimecast acquired Solebit.

On November 14, 2019, Mimecast acquired DMARC Analyzer.

On January 6, 2020, Mimecast acquired Segasec.

On May 19, 2022, Mimecast was acquired by and become a wholly-owned subsidiary of Magnesium Bidco Limited, an affiliate of  Permira Holdings Ltd.

Founding
Mimecast co-founder and CEO, Peter Bauer, previously founded FAB Technology in the mid-nineties and sold it to Idion. Earlier, Peter trained as a Microsoft systems engineer and worked with corporate messaging systems. Mimecast co-founder and CTO is Neil Murray, previously CTO at Global Technology Services and founder of Pro-Solutions.

Other executives include Mimecast Chief Scientist Nathaniel Borenstein, who was amongst the original designers of the MIME protocol for formatting multimedia Internet electronic mail - he sent the world's first e-mail attachment on 11 March 1992.

Technology

The service uses a massively-parallel grid infrastructure for email storage and processing through geographically dispersed data centers. Its Mail Transfer Agent provides intelligent email routing based on server or user mailbox location.

Email Security
 Secure Email Gateway: user optimized spam protection, malware, DoS and DHA protection. Real-time diagnostic and reporting; data loss prevention, secure message delivery, email branding and disclaimer management, document conversion and metadata management, real-time online queue management, large attachment management, advanced routing and spooling.
 Targeted Threat Protection: URL rewriting at the gateway with time-of-click scanning for malicious content before being opened.
 Large File Send: send and receive large files from Outlook, with encryption, optional access key and custom expiration dates.
 Secure Messaging: secure email channel for sensitive information either user-initiated or policy-driven.

Enterprise Information Archiving
 Cloud Archive for Email: Encrypted cloud storage which saves emails in triplicate in an immutable storage system. Users can access and search emails through an Outlook desktop client. Archive access is available via a Mac desktop app and apps for Android, BlackBerry, iOS and Windows Mobile devices.

Mailbox Continuity
 Continuity: During primary mail system outages, email can be accessed via Microsoft Outlook, through a web browser and via mobile devices.

Security and privacy breaches
In January 2021, a Mimecast security certificate was revealed to have been compromised, potentially allowing attackers to intercept communications with Microsoft-based email servers.

References

External links

Software companies of the United Kingdom
Email
Spamming
Companies formerly listed on the Nasdaq
2015 initial public offerings
2022 mergers and acquisitions